Brad Richard Roth is a professor of political science and law at Wayne State University in Detroit, Michigan.

Biography
His research has focused on international law, political theory, and human rights. He received a B.A. from Swarthmore College, a J.D. from Harvard Law School, an LL.M. from Columbia Law School, and a PhD from the University of California at Berkeley. He has been described by James Gathii as a neoconservative realist in reference to Roth's book Governmental Illegitimacy in International Law.. This description has been rejected by Roth in his response to Gathii's review. Roth acknowledges that certain aspects of his book could be portrayed as conservative, "in the limited sense that it seeks to rationalize and bolster the conception of international legal order, premised on the twin principles of self-determination of peoples and non-intervention in international affairs..." Additionally, he grants the book is realist, "to the extent that it takes states (qua political communities entitled to self-government) seriously as units of the international system, and that it treats skeptically efforts to superimpose idealist blueprints on complex and unruly realities." Roth calls the use of the term neoconservative "especially troubling" as it implies an association with an American right-wing movement which "stands for propositions diametrically opposed to the book's central arguments."

Scholarship
Brad R. Roth's books include  Governmental Illegitimacy in International Law (Oxford University Press), Democratic Governance and International Law (edited with Greg Fox, Cambridge University Press), and a forthcoming book on sovereignty. In recent years, Brad Roth has advised the government of Taiwan, including President Chen Shui-bian, on issues of sovereignty and independence from China under international law.

Activism
Roth has been a strong critic of U.S. foreign policy in Nicaragua during the 1970s and 1980s, and supporter of Palestinian rights and a two-state solution. In recent years, he has also emerged as a strong critic of torture policies advocated by people such as John Yoo.

References 

Swarthmore College alumni
Harvard Law School alumni
Columbia Law School alumni
Wayne State University faculty
Living people
Year of birth missing (living people)